Jeff Mitchell Kelly III (born December 13, 1975) is a former American football linebacker in the National Football League (NFL) and Canadian Football League (CFL). He was drafted by the Atlanta Falcons in the sixth round of the 1999 NFL Draft. He played college football at Kansas State.

He currently coaches at Fort Scott Community College.

References

1975 births
Living people
All-American college football players
American football linebackers
Atlanta Falcons players
Canadian football linebackers
Kansas State Wildcats football players
People from La Grange, Texas
Players of American football from Texas
Stephen F. Austin Lumberjacks football players
Toronto Argonauts players